The 1991–92 Eliteserien season was the 35th season of ice hockey in Denmark. Eight teams participated in the league, and Herning IK won the championship. Herlev IK was relegated to the 1. division.

Regular season

Playoffs
The top four teams from the regular season qualified for the playoffs. Herning IK defeated Esbjerg IK in the final, and the Rødovre Mighty Bulls defeated AaB Ishockey in the 3rd place game.

External links
Season on eliteprospects.com

Dan
1991-92
1991 in Danish sport
1992 in Danish sport